The Bani Kaab (singular Al Kaabi ) is an Arab tribe in Oman and the United Arab Emirates, also evident in other Gulf countries.

Origins 
The tribe is associated with the area around and to the north of the Omani Wilayat of Mahdah, and to areas of the Emirates to the East of Buraimi, including the Wadi Khadra, Wadi Hatta and Wadi Qor. 

Subsections of the Bani Kaab include the Drisah, Makatim, Misaid, Miyadilah, Miyalisah, Mizahamiyin, Nawaljiyin, Salalat, Sawalim, Shwaihiyin, Yidwah and Zahairat. Of these, the Drisah and Shwaihiyin were nomadic while the other sections had settled by the turn of the 20th century, a population of some 7,250 of whom 1,150 were Bedouin.

History 
By 1844, the tribe had allied itself (in common with other tribes of the interior of southeastern Arabia) with Sheikh Khalifa bin Shakhbut Al Nayhan of the Bani Yas in a tribal confederation which united to drive Wahhabi forces from Buraimi. Despite their alliance under the Bani Yas, the Bani Kaab were rivals to the Na'im and Bani Qitab, and had pushed sections of the Na'im north as far as the Jiri plain.

In an area and time of shifting alliances, a century later the Bani Kaab were in alliance with the Saudis, the Sheikh of the tribe at the time, Obaid bin Jumah, confirming to the Governor of Saudi Arabia's Eastern Province, "Our territories are yours." Although the Na'im and Bani Kaab were frequently opposed to each other, in the 1940s they came together when the prospect of oil concessions loomed. In this, they were opposed to the oil companies, the imposition of the rule of the Trucial Sheikhs, the Sultan of Muscat and the British alike.

When the Buraimi Dispute unfolded in the 1950s, the Bani Kaab supported the Saudi incursion under Shaikh Rashid bin Hamad of the Al Bu Shamis and were involved in fighting against the British force, the Trucial Oman Levies.

References 

Tribes of the United Arab Emirates